Miguel de los Santos (born 9 August 1973) is a Spanish hurdler. He competed in the men's 110 metres hurdles at the 1996 Summer Olympics.

References

External links
 

1973 births
Living people
Athletes (track and field) at the 1996 Summer Olympics
Spanish male hurdlers
Olympic athletes of Spain
People from Estepona
Sportspeople from the Province of Málaga